Elegaon is a village  located in Bhainsa Mandal in the Adilabad district of Telangana State in India. It has a population of around 3000. Elegaon Gram panchayat contains 10 wards and two neighboring villages, Badgaon and Sirala.

Demographics
As this village comes under the Telangana region of the state Andhra Pradesh (well known as under developed region of this state), it is a backward area. At least half of the people are illiterate. This village has around 3500 people.

Agriculture

Major crops:  
 Rice 
 Cotton 
 Chilly
 Mung (Pesara) 
 Blackgram (Minumu)  
 Jowar (Jonna)  
 Corn (Mokka Jonna)
 Groundnut 
 Pigeon pea (Thogari in local slang) 
 Soybean

References

External links
Basara Saraswathi Devi Temple web site
Official website of the district of Adilabad

Villages in Adilabad district